The 2001–02 season was the 99th competitive season in Belgian football.

National team
Belgium ended their qualifying campaign for the Football World Cup 2002 at the second place in Group 6.  It qualified for the World Cup after the playoff games and lost in the round of 16.

* Belgium score given first

Key
 H = Home match
 A = Away match
 N = Neutral field
 F = Friendly
 WCQ = FIFA World Cup 2002 Qualifying, Group 6
 WCP = FIFA World Cup 2002 Playoff
 WCFR = FIFA World Cup 2002 First Round
 WCSR = FIFA World Cup 2002 Second Round

Honours

See also
 Belgian First Division 2001-02
 2001 Belgian Super Cup
 Belgian Second Division
 Belgian Third Division: divisions A and B
 Belgian Promotion: divisions A, B, C and D

References
 FA website – International results

 
Seasons in Belgian football
Belgium
Football
Football